The Donnas is the debut studio album by American rock band The Donnas, released in 1997, re-released in 1998. (See 1998 in music). The last nine tracks on the re-released version are bonus tracks; they are the nine tracks that were released on three singles prior to the original release of this album.

As of 2005 it has sold 25,000 units in United States according to Nielsen SoundScan.

Track listing
All songs written by Darin Rafaelli, Brett Anderson, Torry Castellano, Maya Ford, and Allison Robertson unless otherwise noted.
"Hey, I'm Gonna Be Your Girl" – 1:47
"Let's Go Mano!" – 1:18
"Teenage Runaway" – 1:55
"Lana & Stevie" – 1:31
"I'm Gonna Make Him Mine (Tonight)" – 2:39
"Huff All Night" – 1:44
"I Don't Wanna Go" – 1:30
"We Don't Go" – 2:28
"Friday Fun" – 1:56
"Everybody's Smoking Cheeba" – 2:10
"Get Rid of That Girl" – 1:40
"Drive In" (Mike Love, Brian Wilson) – 1:34
"Do You Wanna Go Out with Me" – 2:01
"Rock 'n' Roll Boy" – 1:32

Bonus tracks
<li>"High School Yum Yum" – 1:26
<li>"Boy Like You" – 1:29
<li>"Let's Rab" – 1:09
<li>"Let's Go Mano" [original version] – 1:22
<li>"Last Chance Dance" – 2:06
<li>"I Wanna Be a Unabomber" – 1:30
<li>"Da Doo Ron Ron" (Jeff Barry, Ellie Greenwich, Phil Spector) – 1:26
<li>"I Don't Want to Go to School" – 2:04
<li>"I Don't Wanna Rock 'n' Roll Tonight" – 2:48

Personnel
The Donnas
Donna A. - vocals
Donna R. - guitar, vocals
Donna F. - bass guitar, vocals
Donna C. - drums, percussion

References

The Donnas albums
1997 debut albums
Lookout! Records albums

pt:The Donnas (álbum)